Khadak Municipality (Nepali: खडक नगरपालिका) is located in Saptari District in the Province 2 of Nepal. It was formed in 2016 occupying current 11 sections (wards) merging previous Siswa Belhi , Banarjhula, Pansera, Khojpur, Kalyanpur, Fulbariya, Mainasarsabahu and Banauli VDCs, residing its head office at Kalyanpur Bazaar. It occupies an area of 96.77 km2 with a total population of 45,367.

Transportation 
Khadak Municipality is located as a station at Mahendra Highway, thus it is directly linked with it.

Climate

Festivals & Celebrations

Religious Places

Rivers & Bridges

Health

Education 
Public/Government SchoolsWard No. 1 :
 Secondary School, Siswaa Belhi, Saptari
 Gu. Ja. Jaa. Raastriya Primary School, Siswaa Belhi, Saptari

Ward No. 2 :
 Raastriya Basic School, Duhabi, Saptari
 Janata Raastriya Primary School, Siswaa Belhi, Saptari

Ward No. 3 :
 Secondary School, Banarjhula, Saptari
 Janahit Primary School, Banarjhula, Saptari
 Mohmadiya Daarul Hardis, Banarjhula, Saptari
 Madarsha Taalemul Kuraan, Banarjhula, Saptari
 Raastriya Basic School, Kanchira, Saptari
 Raastriya Primary School, Kanchira, Saptari
 Raastriya Primary School, Gururaha, Saptari

Ward No. 4 :
 Secondary School, Pansera, Saptari
 Baageshwari Basic School, Amaha, Saptari
 Madarsha Faizul Ulaf, Amaha, Pansera, Saptari
 Bauku Janta Raastriya Primary School, Karmaniya, Saptari

Ward No. 5 :
 Basic School, Khojpur, Saptari
 Janata Secondary School, Khojpur, Ranjitpur, Saptari
 Raastriya Primary School, Meghawaari, Saptari
 Janta Raastriya Primary School, Kharchuhiyaa, Saptari

Ward No. 6 :
 Secondary School, Kalyanpur, Saptari

Ward No. 7 :
 Janata Raastriya Primary School, Kalyanpur, Saptari
 Raastriya Primary School, Majhau, Saptari
 Shahamaaniya Birpur, Kalyanpur, Saptari

Ward No. 8 :
 Janata Raastriya Primary School, Musaharniya, Bishnupur, Saptari
 Janata Raastriya Primary School, Bhadiya, Saptari
 Resham Raastriya Primary School, Khaisarahaa, Saptari
 Munar Janta Raastriya Primary School, Dholabajaa, Saptari

Ward No. 9 :
 Secondary School, Laalpatti, Saptari
 Ja. Mu. Basic Secondary School, Bajaraahi, Gutthi, Saptari
 Raastriya Primary School, Mainaatole, Saptari
 Raastriya Primary School, Sarpa, Saptari
 Janata Raastriya Primary School, Dangraahi, Saptari

Ward No. 10 :
 Secondary School, Inarwaa, Fulbadiya, Saptari
 Secondary School, Bhairganj, Belha, Saptari
 Raastriya Primary School, Inarwaa Fulbadiyaa, Saptari
 Islam Miya Primary School, Daawatanagar, Inarwaa Fulbadiyaa, Saptari

Ward No. 11 :
 Raastriya Primary School, Banauli, Saptari
 Raastriya Primary School, Amarjyoti Tole, Banauli, Saptari
 Imdaadiya Raastriya Primary School, Nannakaar, Banauli, Saptari
 Raastriya Primary School, Laalpur, Saptari

Banks

Organizations

Market

References 

Populated places in Saptari District
Municipalities in Madhesh Province
Nepal municipalities established in 2017